Soddyite is a mineral of uranium. It has yellow crystals and usually mixed with curite in oxidized uranium ores. It is named after the British radiochemist and physicist Frederick Soddy (1877–1956). Soddyite has been a valid species since 1922, following its discovery in the locality of the Shinkolobwe uranium mine in the Haut-Katanga Province of the Democratic Republic of the Congo (DRC).

References

Uranium(VI) minerals
Nesosilicates
Orthorhombic minerals
Minerals in space group 70